Arachis villosulicarpa is a perennial peanut species, which is cultivated by indigenous people in Mato Grosso, a state of Brazil. Its wild progenitor is thought to be Arachis pietrarellii. Although it is related to the common peanut, Arachis hypogaea, it was separately domesticated: A. villosulicarpa is diploid, whereas A. hypogaea is tetraploid.

It is one of several species that might be used as gene source for plant breeding to improve the important cultivated peanut Arachis hypogaea.

References

External links
International Legume Database & Information Service: Arachis villosulicarpa

USDA Plants Profile: Arachis villosulicarpa
 EMBRAPA: Arachis villosulicarpa

villosulicarpa
Flora of Brazil